Fimmen is a surname. Notable people with the surname include:

Edo Fimmen (1881–1942), Dutch trade unionist
Kurt Fimmen, German World War II Navy commander
Waldo Fimmen (1889–1968), American politician